Harvey Dent, later known as Two-Face, is a fictional character from the superhero films Batman (1989) and Batman Forever (1995), adapted from the DC Comics supervillain of the same name. In the first film, Harvey is a supporting character (played by Billy Dee Williams) is introduced as the newly elected district attorney of Gotham City, who vows to lock up crime boss Carl Grissom. By the end of the film, he becomes an ally of Batman and Commissioner Gordon in their war on crime. However, at least two years before the events of Batman Forever, Harvey is hideously scarred on the left side of his face after mob boss Sal Maroni throws acidic chemicals at him during a court trial. He subsequently goes insane and becomes the criminal "Two-Face", who is obsessed with the number two and the concept of duality and uses a two-headed coin which was also damaged on one side by the acid to make decisions. During the film, Two-Face (portrayed by Tommy Lee Jones) allies with the Riddler to learn Batman's secret identity and exact revenge on him for failing to save him.

While this version of Two-Face is a much more faithful adaptation of the comic book character than most other villains from the 1990s Batman film series, he is depicted as more comedic rather than threatening, and is responsible for the death of Dick Grayson's family and his subsequent transformation into Robin (a role which is filled by mob boss Tony Zucco in the comics). Although Batman Forever received mixed reviews, Jones' portrayal of Two-Face was one of the few elements that were praised. 

This version of Two-Face returned in a comic book series titled Batman '89, which continued the stories of the first two Batman films directed by Tim Burton while retconning Batman Forever and its 1997 sequel, Batman & Robin. As such, the character of Two-Face was reimagined, and remodeled to resemble Billy Dee Williams, as in The Lego Batman Movie (2017). The comic book was launched by DC in August 2021.

Film appearances

Batman (1989) 

In the first Batman film, Harvey Dent is introduced as the new district attorney of Gotham City, who is ordered by Mayor Borg (Lee Wallace) to work with Commissioner Gordon (Pat Hingle) to make the city safer. Dent and Gordon look into front companies used by crime boss Carl Grissom (Jack Palance), and were close to having him convicted. However, Grissom destroys evidence, including attempting to kill his own right-hand man Jack Napier (Jack Nicholson), before they are able to do so. After Napier, as the Joker, murders Grissom and takes over his operations, Dent and his department attempt to bring him down, but their efforts are once again mostly useless, mainly because they do not know the Joker's identity at the time. After Batman (Michael Keaton) kills the Joker and the GCPD apprehends his remaining men, Dent receives a letter from the vigilante, promising that he will continue to protect Gotham from crime, and telling them to use the Bat-Signal to summon him in times of need.

Batman Forever (1995) 

Harvey's origins as Two-Face are explained via a brief television news segment in Batman Forever. During the trial of Sal Maroni (Dennis Paladino), the crime boss throws acid on Harvey's left face, damaging not only half of feature but also his brain's. This incident breaks the district attorney's psyche, and he becomes the criminal Two-Face. Maroni's fate is left unknown, although he was probably murdered by Two-Face like in the comics. 

Two-Face refers to himself in the plural, and has a moll for each side of his personality - the angelic Sugar (Drew Barrymore) for his "good" side, and the tempestuous "Spice" (Debi Mazar) for his "bad" side. He also swears revenge against Batman (Val Kilmer) for failing to save him. After defusing a hostage situation orchestrated by Two-Face, Batman pursues him to the statue of Lady Gotham, but Two-Face escapes. Later, Two-Face and his henchmen attack Haly's Circus and during a hostage situation, he murders Dick Grayson's (Chris O'Donnell) family, who were helping to get rid of a bomb rigged to explode at the annual Gotham Circus for the social elite unless Batman revealed his identity. Following this, Dick is taken in as a ward of Bruce Wayne's and becomes Robin, wishing to kill Two-Face in revenge, which goes against Batman's code. 

Two-Face eventually teams up with Edward Nygma (Jim Carrey) to learn Batman's secret identity.  They commit a series of robberies to finance Nygma's new company and mass-produce his brainwave device, the “Box”, which secretly steals information from users’ minds. Nygma hosts a party where he goads Bruce into using the Box, before Two-Face unexpectedly arrives. As Batman, Bruce pursues Two-Face and is nearly killed, but Dick rescues him. Having discovered Batman's identity, Two-Face and Nygma later attack the Batcave, shoot Bruce, and kidnap his love interest Dr. Chase Meridian (Nicole Kidman). Batman and Robin infiltrate Nygma's lair to rescue her, but get separated and the latter is also captured after encountering Two-Face and deciding to spare him. After Batman rescues Chase and Robin and defeats Nygma, Two-Face confronts them and flips his coin to decide their fate. Batman throws a handful of coins into the air, causing Two-Face to panic and fall to his apparent death.

The Lego Batman Movie
The 1989 Billy Dee Williams incarnation of Harvey Dent appears in The Lego Batman Movie, voiced by Williams again, where he is an associate of Joker, and relies less on coin-flipping, acting mainly out of will (though he still does have a coin). He also has a far more gruesome appearance, with his skull exposed on the disfigured side of his face. The movie additionally gives him melted hair, a contrast to his more popular designs in which his hair perks up. The movie’s background offers hints on his downfall, including a Harvey Dent campaign poster seen in the background with the right side mainly scratched out. He also uses an excavator in the opening scene to raid the energy facility.

Comic appearances
Dent is the main antagonist of Batman '89, a limited series that takes place after Batman Returns and ignores Joel Schumacher's films. Dent's appearance is based on Billy Dee Williams from the original 1989 film, but does become Two-Face this time.

Dent's backstory is further explored. He was orphaned as an infant after his mother was killed by a drunk driver, and grew up in a poor, Black neighborhood in Gotham City called Burnside. He was mentored by Jerome Otis, an auto shop owner who inspired him to become "a big man" when he grew up and gave him a two-headed coin. Dent grew up to become a district attorney hoping to improve Burnside, but rarely had the opportunity to do so because of corruption in the D.A.'s office. 

At the beginning of the story, Dent gets engaged to his longtime girlfriend, GCPD Sergeant Barbara Gordon. Their date is interrupted by a war between a gang of Joker-inspired criminals and a group of vigilantes dressed up as Batman. Dent vows to take down the real Batman, whom he holds responsible for inspiring these copycats, as well as police commissioner (and Barbara's father) Jim Gordon, who poses a possible obstacle in his path to become state attorney general. He works closely with Barbara to try to find out Batman's secrets and has a reverend from Burnside speak out against Gordon and publicly request a vote of no confidence against him in Gotham City Council. 

He calls the National Guard to help restore order and tries to lure Batman into a trap using the Bat-Signal with Lieutenant Harvey Bullock. When the Guard encounter Batman, a young man in Burnside who committed a robbery to help his younger sister is killed by a stray bullet. After Dent is criticized by the Burnside neighborhood council for his vendetta against Batman putting them in danger, he makes a powerful televised speech denouncing the violence. His speech (as well as the thief's death) inspires Bruce Wayne to speak with the council and Dent at Otis' auto shop and offers to pay for four years at Gotham University for all of the children in Burnside. Shortly after the meeting, the shop is set ablaze by the Batman impersonators, who tracked Otis' mechanic Drake Winston to the garage after he stopped them from robbing a store during the speech. After learning Drake is still in the building, Dent goes into the burning auto shop to rescue him, only to fall unconscious near broken car batteries leaking sulfuric acid.

Dent has a dream in which he rescues Drake and is hailed as a hero by the press, resulting in him becoming governor. In reality, he is saved from the auto shop by Bruce and Drake and taken to the hospital after the left side of his face is disfigured by the sulfuric acid. While in the hospital, he dreams about meeting himself as governor. His other self discusses how the universe splits every time an event has two possible outcomes and encourages him to think about the power in the choices he makes. This inspires him to make marks on one side of his two-headed coin. Barbara notices Dent is displaying increasingly erratic behavior and is now heavily relying on his coin to make most of his decisions. He later escapes his hospital room and takes off the bandages that were covering the burnt half of his face before stealing a computer and multiple files from the GCPD. He retreats into the subway and sets up the abandoned Burnside station as his new base of operations.

Dent hires a criminal the police use as an informant who was connected to "The Lincoln Job", a case where a group of robbers attempted to rob 31 million dollars in two armored cars, and uses him to recruit the various Joker gangs for an attack on the GCPD. He shoots Bullock and manages to kidnap Gordon after he uses Batman's own batarang against him. He begins donating some of the money to the residents of Burnside and discovers the suitcase from the Lincoln Job contained incriminating documents that revealed Lincoln Savings and Loan had been running federal aid funds through a string of mobbed-up front companies which resulted in millions in kickbacks for politicians and less for the city. He invites Barbara to meet him at the city park that night to discuss his plans for the city, but she attempts to arrest him for leading the assault on GCPD and kidnapping her father. Dent makes it back to his hideout after Catwoman knocks Barbara out and decides to shoot Gordon despite the coin telling him not to. When Batman arrives to take him out, Dent blows up the station and critically injures him. He unmasks Batman as Bruce Wayne and takes a picture of him and overhears Catwoman revealing she knows Batman's vigilante partner is Drake.

With the documents from the Lincoln Job, Dent has control over all the major politicians in the city and orders them to drop all charges against him. He displays his dominance against them by killing notorious crime boss Carmine Falcone right in front of them. The next day, he goes to the auto shop to visit Otis, who chastises him for his actions. Dent kills Otis to prevent the council from making any public statement against him and frames Drake for the crime. He then goes to Wayne Manor and attempts to blackmail Bruce into making Batman his enforcer in the Batcave. Bruce refuses and instead allows Dent to flip his coin to give him two options: Kill Bruce, or allow Bruce to help him reform so they could work together to save the city the right way. As Dent flips the coin, Catwoman cuts the giant penny hanging in the Batcave and makes it land right next to him, causing him to stumble off the ledge. As Bruce attempts to help him up, Dent has visions of multiple outcomes of the future. He tells Bruce he saw one outcome where everyone turns out happy in the end and decides the world doesn't need him anymore before the cable he was hanging onto breaks and he falls to his death.

Bruce chastises Selina for her actions and claims he palmed Dent's coin so that it would've landed on the good side no matter what, but she finds out he actually gave Dent his own coin back. Barbara later receives a package from the deceased Dent with his pictures proving Bruce Wayne is Batman.

Production
Batman director Tim Burton cast Billy Dee Williams in the role of Harvey Dent because he wanted to include the villain Two-Face in a future film using the concept of an African-American Two-Face for the black and white concept. Williams was set to reprise his role in Batman Returns, which would have depicted Harvey's transformation into Two-Face, but the idea was scrapped and the role he would have played in the story was filled by an original character, corrupt business tycoon Max Schreck (played by Christopher Walken). 

Batman Forever was not directed by Burton, but by Joel Schumacher, who cast Tommy Lee Jones as Harvey Dent / Two-Face after previously working with him on The Client. Al Pacino, Clint Eastwood, Martin Sheen, Willem Dafoe, Nicolas Cage, Robert De Niro, and Mel Gibson were also considered to play the character; Gibson had to turn down the role due to his work on Braveheart at the time. The re-casting disappointed Williams, who accepted to play Harvey in the first Batman film only because we has promised that he would get to play Two-Face in a future installment. There was a rumor that Schumacher had to pay Williams a fee in order to hire Jones, but Williams said that it was not true: "You only get paid if you do the movie. I had a two-picture deal with Star Wars. They paid me for that, but I only had a one picture deal for Batman." In the original script, Two-Face's female thugs Sugar and Spice were known as "Lace" and "Leather" for their clothing styles.

Rick Baker designed the prosthetic makeup for Tommy Lee Jones as Two-Face. There was originally a more in-depth sequence at involving Two-Face escaping from Arkham Asylum at the beginning of the film, but it was cut.

Joel Schumacher mentioned Tommy Lee Jones as a source of trouble: "Jim Carrey was a gentleman, and Tommy Lee was threatened by him. I'm tired of defending overpaid, overprivileged actors. I pray I don't work with them again." Schumacher commented again years later on Jones' alleged conflict with Carrey, saying, "No, [Jones] wasn’t kind to Jim. He did not act towards Jim the way an Oscar winner with a star on Hollywood Boulevard, being the oldest member of the cast, and having such a distinguished career and the accolades to go with it, should have acted towards Jim. But what happens on the set stays on the set." Carrey later acknowledged Jones was not friendly to him, telling him once off-set during the production, "I hate you. I really don't like you ... I cannot sanction your buffoonery."

Ernesto Aura did the Spanish dubbing for Tommy Lee Jones in Batman Forever.

Legacy
Billy Dee Williams voices Two-Face in the 2017 animated film, The Lego Batman Movie, as a nod to his role as Harvey Dent in the 1989 Batman film.

Notes

References

External links

Action film villains
Batman (1989 film series)
Batman live-action film characters
Black characters in films
Coin flipping
Fictional characters with disfigurements
Fictional crime bosses
Fictional district attorneys
Fictional mass murderers
Fictional rampage and spree killers
Film characters introduced in 1989
Film supervillains
Male film villains
Fictional kidnappers
Fictional African-American people